Arctostaphylos viridissima is a species of manzanita known by the common names whitehair manzanita and McMinn's manzanita. It is endemic to Santa Cruz Island, one of the Channel Islands of California.

Description
Arctostaphylos viridissima is a shrub varying in shape and size. It may be a matted bush one metre (~3 ft) tall to a spreading treelike form over 4 metres (~12 ft) in height. Its stem and branches are covered in peeling red bark and its smaller twigs are woolly and bear long white bristles. The leaves are oval in shape, fuzzy when new and green and shiny when mature, reaching 3.5 cm.

The inflorescence is a dense cluster of urn-shaped manzanita flowers. The fruit is a fuzzy drupe just over a centimeter wide.

References

External links

Jepson Manual Treatment of 'Arctostaphylos viridissima
USDA Plants Profile
'Arctostaphylos viridissima — UC Photo gallery

viridissima
Endemic flora of California
Natural history of the California chaparral and woodlands
Natural history of the Channel Islands of California
Plants described in 1933